The MK9 Corvette was ordered by the Nigerian Navy in April 1975 as follow-ons to the smaller Vosper Thornycroft MK3, which was confusedly grouped under the same Hippo class designation, both ships being named after the word for hippopotamus in local languages. The two ships were built by Vosper Thornycroft.

Laid down in October 1975, NNS Erinomi was launched on 20 January 1977 and commissioned on 29 January 1980. She was given the pennant number F83. She stopped making patrols in 1993 due to constant breakdowns. In 1994-1995 she underwent a refit at Lagos which at least made her seaworthy again, but with some systems off-line. The Erinomi participated in a December 1995 naval exercise; she rarely left port thereafter until 1997, when minor repairs allowed her to again undertake patrols, but by 2007 the ship was again non-operational.

Her sister ship, the NNS Enyimiri, was commenced in February 1977, launched on 9 February 1978 and commissioned on 2 May 1980. She was given the pennant number F84. She had ceased patrols in 1992 and by 1996 was in extremely bad shape. In 2000 a major repair effort allowed her to leave port again, although with most sensors and some weapons nonfunctional.  In December 2004, the Enyimiri suffered a massive explosion resulting in crew fatalities and severe damage to the ship.  She was decommissioned on 22 December 2004.

Citations

References 
 

Patrol vessels of the Nigerian Navy